"Død Kalm" is the nineteenth episode of the second season of the American science fiction television series The X-Files. It premiered on the Fox network on March 10, 1995. The story was written by Howard Gordon, the teleplay was written by Gordon and Alex Gansa, and the episode was directed by Rob Bowman. The episode is a "Monster-of-the-Week" story, unconnected to the series' wider mythology. "Død Kalm" earned a Nielsen household rating of 10.7, being watched by 10.2 million households in its initial broadcast. The episode received mostly mixed-to-positive reviews.

The show centers on FBI special agents Fox Mulder (David Duchovny) and Dana Scully (Gillian Anderson) who work on cases linked to the paranormal, called X-Files. In the episode, Mulder and Scully are called in when a boatload of survivors from a U.S. Navy destroyer escort are found. What particularly catches Agent Mulder's attention is that all of these sailors appear to have aged many decades in the course of a few days. Mulder and Scully travel to Norway where they find a civilian fisherman who is willing to take them to the ship's last known position.

"Død Kalm" was written to make use of the show's access to a navy destroyer that had previously featured in "Colony" and "End Game." The episode was originally intended as a way to give the production crew a rest after several demanding episodes had been shot, but the episode became one of the more difficult to film during the second season. The episode's title evokes that of the suspense film Dead Calm in a Norwegian-inspired form, joining the Norwegian død (dead) with a recognizable but Norwegian-styled respelling of the word "calm".

Plot
In the Norwegian Sea, chaos erupts on board the USS Ardent, an American destroyer escort. Due to mysterious yet unspecified events, half of Ardents crew board lifeboats and abandon ship against the captain's orders. Eighteen hours later, they are spotted by a Canadian fishing vessel; however, in that short span of time, the young crew members have undergone rapid aging.

Dana Scully (Gillian Anderson) and Fox Mulder (David Duchovny) visit the ship's sole surviving crew member, Lt. Harper, who has been quarantined at the Bethesda Naval Hospital. Scully finds that Harper, despite being in his twenties, has aged to the point of being unrecognizable. Mulder explains that Ardent vanished at the 65th parallel, a location with a history of ship disappearances. Mulder believes that a "wrinkle in time" exists there, and that Ardent was the subject of government experimentation related to the Philadelphia Experiment from World War II.

In Norway, Mulder and Scully get Henry Trondheim (John Savage), a naval trawler captain, to take them to Ardent'''s last known location. After crashing into the bow of Ardent, Mulder, Scully, and Trondheim find signs of advanced corrosion, even though the warship is only a few years old. Below decks, the party finds the mummified remains of several crew members. They also find the wizened commanding officer of Ardent, Captain Barclay, who claims that "time got lost" after his ship encountered a "glowing light" in the ocean. Trondheim's boat is stolen and his first mate is murdered.

Trondheim is later attacked by a Norwegian pirate whaler named Olafsson, who has not aged despite being on the ship for the past two days. Mulder, Scully, and Trondheim eventually begin to age unnaturally. Scully develops a theory that Ardent is sailing near a metallic object beneath the ocean, and that it has caused free radicals to rapidly oxidize their bodies and age them. When Mulder notices that the ship's sewage pipe is the only one not corroded through, the agents realize that something from the ocean contaminated Ardents potable water and led to the aging; Olafsson and his men remained unaffected due to their consumption of recycled water from the sewage system. Desperate to survive, Trondheim kills Olafsson after he reveals the secret, and sets out to keep the water for himself.

Scully learns from blood tests that the contaminated water causes rapid oxidative damage and dramatically increases sodium chloride in the body. She tries to ration the drinkable water amongst the three, but discovers Trondheim attempting to hoard what little that remains. Trondheim locks Scully out of the sewage hold, forcing her to use minuscule supplies to keep Mulder alive. The mysterious oxidant eventually eats through the ship's hull, flooding the hold and drowning Trondheim. The agents both lose consciousness shortly before Navy rescuers arrive at the ship. Scully comes to at the hospital, where she is told that her written observations on the case helped naval doctors reverse their aging and save Mulder from near-certain death. Scully says that she wants to return to Ardent for more research, but the doctor tells her that the ship sank shortly after their rescue due to the flooding.

Production

Writing

Prior to this episode being produced, the Canadian Forces had granted permission for the show to use  (a decommissioned destroyer) for the production of "Colony" and "End Game". Series creator Chris Carter, wanting to take full advantage of this rare opportunity, asked Howard Gordon to write another episode that could also be filmed on the ship. In the book The Unofficial X-Files Companion, N.E. Genge notes that aspects of the episode bear striking resemblances to the Philadelphia Experiment, the apocryphal naval military experiment that lives on as an urban legend.

Filming

It was initially believed that by using the same set for three episodes, the production crew would be given something of a break; before the script for "Død Kalm" was finished, Carter even expressed his belief that the episode would provide everyone with a "great rest".Lowry, p. 209 Unfortunately, when the crew began using the ship, a number of problems set in. For one thing, the temperature dropped substantially, making the entire filming process uncomfortable for both the cast and crew. The close quarters of the ship also meant that production was relatively cramped. Finally, the makeup applied to Duchovny and Anderson took hours each day to apply, resulting in substantial delays. Director Rob Bowman later called "Død Kalm" the "episode from Hell" due to these issues.

The show's production crew shot most of the episode's interior and exterior scenes on Mackenzie.Lovece, p. 157 The ship was repainted "rust brown" in order to more closely resemble an abandoned shipa technique Graeme Murray referred to as "paint-aged." Mackenzie had originally been moored at New Westminster Quay, but in order to avoid light pollution from the Greater Vancouver area during exterior shots, the ship was moved to the more remote location in the Strait of Georgiaa move that cost the show around $10,000. Shortly after production of "Død Kalm" was finished, Mackenzie was scuttled and now serves as an artificial reef off the Strait.

To ease filming, the producers sought out a set that they could use as both a bar and a hospitala task initially believed "impossible" by the show's location scouts. Eventually, Jericho Sailing Club in Vancouver was selected. When the set was completed, the cast and crew of "Død Kalm" reportedly found it "amazing". Duchovny was particularly pleased because it was only a short distance away from where he was living at the time. The producers subsequently decided to find possible locations closer to where the main stars were living in order to ease future filming.

Broadcast and reception
"Død Kalm" premiered on the Fox network on March 10, 1995, and was first broadcast in the United Kingdom on BBC Two on January 16, 1996. This episode earned a Nielsen rating of 10.7, with an 18 share, meaning that roughly 10.7 percent of all television-equipped households, and 18 percent of households watching television, were tuned into the episode. It was viewed by 10.2 million households.

"Død Kalm" received mostly mixed to moderately positive reviews. Entertainment Weekly gave "Død Kalm" a B, noting that, "Despite clumsy makeup, isolation pays off again, and Mulder and Scully get to try a little tenderness." Emily VanDerWerff from The A.V. Club, despite noting her original dislike for the episode, awarded it a B rating and wrote, "This episode works, almost in spite of itself. There are so many nice little moments here [...] it's a script that pauses from the constant horror the show had been serving up for several episodes in a row to just tell an unsettling, ultimately moving tale of two friends who look into the abyss and somehow don't fall."

Robert Shearman and Lars Pearson, in their book Wanting to Believe: A Critical Guide to The X-Files, Millennium & The Lone Gunmen'', rated the episode three-and-a-half stars out of five.  The two noted that, while the episode's premise "brims over with atmosphere", the ending of "Død Kalm" was extremely lacking. Shearman and Pearson argued "that if the writers can only devise a plot which paints them into a corner so awkward there's no realistic way they can get out, then they shouldn't write the story at all." The two also criticized the episode's make up. They noted that "Scully looks like a credible old lady, Mulder rather more like a man wearing several layers of latex."

Footnotes

Bibliography

External links

"Død Kalm" on TheXFiles.com

1995 American television episodes
Television episodes set in Maryland
Television episodes set in Norway
The X-Files (season 2) episodes
Rapid human age change in fiction